Rosalba is a feminine personal name, derived from the Latin rosa alba, the white rose.  Although known in English, the name is especially associated with Italy, and is also common in Spanish and Portuguese-speaking countries, where it is also a surname.

It may refer to any of the following individuals:

Rosalba, a character in The Rose and the Ring, a novel by William Makepeace Thackeray.
Rosalba, a character in The Rose Rent, a mystery novel by Ellis Peters that was dramatized in an episode of the TV series Cadfael.
Rosalba Carriera (1673–1757), a Venetian painter and portraitist of the Rococo style.
Rosalba Casas, professor of history and socio-politics at Montreal University.
Rosalba Cimino (born 1990), Italian politician
Rosalba Gualito Castañeda (b. 1966), a Mexican politician and member of the Institutional Revolutionary Party.
Rosalba Rincon Castell (1934–2014), a Colombian fencing instructor.
Rosalba Ciarlini (b. 1952), a Brazilian politician of Italian descent.
Rosaria Console (b. 1979), an Italian long-distance runner, better known as "Rosalba."
Rosalba Forciniti (b. 1986), a member of the 2012 Italian Olympic Judo team.
Rosalba Neri (b. 1939), an Italian actress also known by the name "Sara Bey" or "Bay".
Rosalba Pedrina (b. 1944), an Italian artist and resident of Vicenza.
Rosalba Pippa (b. 1982), an Italian singer and actress, also known by her stage name, Arisa.
Rosalba De la Cruz Requena (b. 1954), a Mexican politician and member of the Institutional Revolutionary Party.
Simone Rosalba (b. 1976), a member of the 2000 Italian Olympic volleyball team.
Rosalba Todaro, a prominent Chilean economist and scholar of women's economic issues.

See also
Rosalba (beetle), a genus of longhorn beetles
Rosalba, la fanciulla di Pompei, a 1952 Italian film

Italian feminine given names
Given names derived from plants or flowers